Lowland Semang may refer to:
Any of several languages of Malaysia also known as Wila' or Bila'
A spurious language of Indonesia listed in Ethnologue 14